Benny Gordon (1932 – December 24, 2008) was an American soul and R&B singer who recorded from the early 1960s up to the 1970s. Some of his early efforts were as a member of Christian Harmonizers. Their recordings were credited to The Christian Harmonizers (Featuring B. Gordon). Later recordings were as Bennie Gordon And The Soul Brothers.  In 1968, they had a single out on the RCA label, "What Is Soul" which was backed with "I Can't Turn You Loose".

Benny Gordon & the Soul Brothers were to appear at Trude Heller's regularly and in 1967 appeared there with Reparata & the Delrons Benny and the Soul Brothers even performed for the opening day of Trude Hellers Take V club that opened on December 18, 1970.

As a solo singer he released singles "True Love Is All I Need" on the Capitol label, "Gonna Give Her All The Love I Got" on Wand label and "Sugar Mama" (You Know You're My Baby) on the Estill label.

Biography
Gordon was born and raised Estill, South Carolina.
Along with his brother, Sammy Gordon, he was a member of the Christian Harmonizers, a gospel group. In the early 1960s they moved to Brooklyn. They later formed The Soul Brothers band. They became the house band at Trude Heller's club on Sixth Avenue in Greenwich Village.

In 1968 Benny Gordon and the Soul Brothers released the album Tighten Up that featured the tracks "Tighten Up" and "Hang on Sloopy".

Gordon is related to Sammy Gordon who fronted the group Sammy Gordon & the Hip Huggers who recorded "Upstairs On Boston Road", and an early version of Bobby Womack's "Breezin'" that George Benson would later have a hit with. Some sources credit them as cousins while others credit them as brothers.

He died on December 24, 2008, from an inoperable stomach tumor at the age of 77.

Benny Gordon & the Soul Brothers discography

Singles

Benny Gordon discography

Other

Further reading

References

External links
 The "B" Side Tribute
 beachmusic45.com Beach Buzz February 13 - Records Benny Gordon info
 Estill Records
 Benny Gordon at All Music
 Gonna Give Her All The Love I Got (Wand 1188) discussed

American soul singers
RCA Victor artists
Capitol Records artists
Wand Records artists
People from Hampton County, South Carolina
1932 births
2008 deaths
20th-century African-American male singers